Calvert Ray Dixon, III (born October 11, 1969) is an American former college and professional football player who was an offensive lineman in the National Football League (NFL) for five seasons during the 1990s.  Dixon played college football for the University of Florida, and thereafter, he played professionally for the New York Jets and the Miami Dolphins of the NFL.

Early years 

Dixon was born in Fort Lauderdale, Florida in 1969.  He attended Merritt Island High School in Merritt Island, Florida, and played high school football for the Merritt Island Mustangs.

College career 

Dixon accepted an athletic scholarship to attend the University of Florida in Gainesville, Florida, where he played center for coach Galen Hall and coach Steve Spurrier's Florida Gators football teams from 1988 to 1991.  As a senior in 1991, Dixon was a team captain and a member of the Gators' first Southeastern Conference (SEC) championship squad.  He was a first-team All-SEC selection in 1990 and 1991, an Associated Press second-team All-American, the winner of the SEC's Jacobs Blocking Trophy, and the recipient of the Gators' Fergie Ferguson Award in 1991.  He was also recognized as an SEC Academic Honor Roll honoree all four years and a member of the College Football Association's Scholar-Athlete Team in 1991.

Professional career 

He played in sixty-six NFL games, starting in twelve of them. Dixon was signed by the Orlando Predators in 2002.

See also 

 Florida Gators football, 1990–99
 List of Florida Gators football All-Americans
 List of Florida Gators in the NFL Draft
 List of Miami Dolphins players
 List of New York Jets players
 List of SEC Jacobs Blocking Trophy winners
 List of University of Florida alumni

References

Bibliography 

 Carlson, Norm, University of Florida Football Vault: The History of the Florida Gators, Whitman Publishing, LLC, Atlanta, Georgia (2007).  .
 Golenbock, Peter, Go Gators!  An Oral History of Florida's Pursuit of Gridiron Glory, Legends Publishing, LLC, St. Petersburg, Florida (2002).  .
 Hairston, Jack, Tales from the Gator Swamp: A Collection of the Greatest Gator Stories Ever Told, Sports Publishing, LLC, Champaign, Illinois (2002).  .
 McCarthy, Kevin M.,  Fightin' Gators: A History of University of Florida Football, Arcadia Publishing, Mount Pleasant, South Carolina (2000).  .
 Nash, Noel, ed., The Gainesville Sun Presents The Greatest Moments in Florida Gators Football, Sports Publishing, Inc., Champaign, Illinois (1998).  .

1969 births
Living people
American football centers
American football offensive guards
Florida Gators football players
Miami Dolphins players
New York Jets players
Orlando Predators players
Players of American football from Fort Lauderdale, Florida